Poona Bayabao, officially the Municipality of Poona Bayabao (Maranao: Inged a Poona Bayabao), is a 4th class municipality in the province of Lanao del Sur, Philippines. According to the 2020 census, it has a population of 31,141 people.

It is formerly known as Gata.

Geography

Barangays

Poona Bayabao is politically subdivided into 25 barangays.

Climate

Demographics

Economy

References

External links
 Poona Bayabao Profile at the DTI Cities and Municipalities Competitive Index
 [ Philippine Standard Geographic Code]
Philippine Standard Geographic Code
Philippine Census Information

Municipalities of Lanao del Sur
Populated places on Lake Lanao